The military career of Adolf Hitler, dictator of Germany from 1933 to 1945, can be divided into two distinct portions of his life. Mainly, the period during World War I when Hitler served as a Gefreiter (lance corporal) in the Bavarian Army, and the era of World War II when Hitler served as the Supreme Commander-in-Chief of the Wehrmacht (German Armed Forces) through his position as Führer of Nazi Germany.

History

First World War

In Vienna, where he had been living in relative poverty since 1907, Hitler received the final part of his father's estate in May 1913 and moved to Munich, where he earned money painting architectural scenes. He may have left Vienna to evade conscription into the Austrian Army. The Bavarian police sent him back to Salzburg for induction into the Austrian Army, but he failed his physical exam on 5 February 1914 and returned to Munich.

He was 25 years old in August 1914, when Austria-Hungary and the German Empire entered the First World War. Because of his Austrian citizenship, he had to request permission to serve in the Bavarian Army. Permission was granted. On the evidence of a report by the Bavarian authorities in 1924, which questioned how Hitler was allowed to serve in the Bavarian Army, Hitler almost certainly was enlisted through an error on the part of the government. The authorities could not explain why he was not deported back to Austria in 1914 after he failed his physical exam for the Austrian Army. They concluded that the matter of Hitler's citizenship was simply not raised; thus he was allowed to enter the Bavarian Army. In the army, Hitler continued to put forth his German nationalist ideas which he developed from a young age.

During the war, Hitler served in France and Belgium in the Bavarian Reserve Infantry Regiment 16 (1st Company of the List Regiment). He was an infantryman in the 1st Company during the First Battle of Ypres (October 1914), which Germans remember as the Kindermord bei Ypern (Ypres Massacre of the Innocents) because approximately 40,000 men (between a third and a half, many of them university students) of nine newly-enlisted infantry divisions became casualties in the first twenty days. Hitler's regiment entered the battle with 3,600 men but at its end mustered only 611 men. By December, Hitler's own company of 250 was reduced to 42. Biographer John Keegan claims that this experience drove Hitler to become aloof and withdrawn for the remaining years of war. After the battle, Hitler was promoted from Schütze (private) to Gefreiter (lance corporal). He was assigned to be a regimental message-runner.

Some have regarded this assignment as "a relatively safe job", because regimental headquarters was often several miles behind the front. According to Thomas Weber, earlier historians of the period had not distinguished between regimental runners, who were based away from the front "in relative comfort", and company, or battalion runners, who moved among the trenches and were more often under fire.

Messengers' duties changed as the German Army on the Western Front settled into their defensive positions as a result of the ongoing stalemate. Fewer messages went by foot or bicycle and more by telephone. Hitler's circle of comrades also served at headquarters. They laughed at "Adi" for his aversion to smutty stories, and traded their jam rations for his tobacco.

In early 1915, Lance Corporal Hitler adopted a stray dog he named Fuchsl (Little Fox), who was taught many tricks and became his companion. Hitler described him as a "proper circus dog". In August 1917 the List Regiment transferred to a quiet sector of the front in Alsace. During the journey, both Fuchsl and Hitler's portfolio of sketches and paintings were stolen. Hitler, though heartbroken by his loss, did take his first leave, which consisted of an 18-day visit to Berlin where he stayed with the family of a comrade.

The List Regiment fought in many battles, including the First Battle of Ypres (1914), the Battle of the Somme (1916), the Battle of Arras (1917), and the Battle of Passchendaele (1917). During the Battle of Fromelles on 19–20 July 1916 the Australians, mounting their first attack in France, assaulted the Bavarian positions. The Bavarians repulsed the attackers, who suffered the second-highest losses they had on any day on the Western Front, about 7,000 men. The history of the List Regiment hailed this brilliant defense as the "personification of the German Army on the Western Front".

At the Nuremberg Trials, two of his former superiors testified that Hitler had refused to be considered for promotion.
Hitler was twice decorated for bravery. He received the Iron Cross Second Class in 1914 and the Iron Cross First Class in 1918, an honour rarely given to a lance corporal. Hitler's First Class Iron Cross was recommended by Lieutenant Hugo Gutmann, a Jewish adjutant in the List Regiment. According to Weber, this rare award was commonly awarded to those posted to regimental headquarters, such as Hitler, who had contact with more senior officers than did combat soldiers. Hitler's Iron Cross First Class was awarded after an attack in open warfare during which messengers were indispensable and on a day in which the depleted regiment lost 60 killed and 211 wounded.

During the Battle of the Somme in October 1916 Hitler received a wound in his left thigh when a shell exploded at the entrance to the dispatch runners' dugout. He begged not to be evacuated, but was sent for almost two months to the Red Cross hospital at Beelitz in Brandenburg. Thereafter, he was ordered to the depot in Munich. He wrote to his commanding officer, Hauptmann Fritz Wiedemann, asking that he be recalled to the regiment because he could not tolerate Munich when he knew his comrades were at the Front. Wiedemann arranged for Hitler's return to his regiment on 5 March 1917.

On 15 October 1918, he and several comrades were temporarily blinded—and according to Friedelind Wagner, Hitler also lost his voice—due to a British mustard gas attack. After initial treatment, Hitler was hospitalized in Pasewalk in Pomerania. While there, on 10 November, Hitler learned of Germany's defeat from a pastor, and—by his own account—on receiving this news he suffered a second bout of blindness. Hitler was outraged by the subsequent Treaty of Versailles (1919), which forced Germany to accept responsibility for starting the war, deprived Germany of various territories, demilitarised the Rhineland (which the Allies occupied), and imposed economically damaging sanctions. Hitler later wrote: "When I was confined to bed, the idea came to me that I would liberate Germany, that I would make it great. I knew immediately that it would be realized." However, it is unlikely that he committed himself to a career in politics at that point in time.

On 19 November 1918, Hitler was discharged from the Pasewalk hospital and returned to Munich. Arriving on 21 November, he was assigned to 7th Company of the 1st Replacement Battalion of the 2nd Infantry Regiment. In December he was reassigned to a Prisoner of War camp in Traunstein as a guard. There he would stay until the camp dissolved January 1919.

He returned to Munich and spent a few months in barracks waiting for reassignment. Munich, then part of the People's State of Bavaria, was in a state of chaos with a number of assassinations occurring, including that of socialist Kurt Eisner who was shot dead in Munich by a German nationalist on 21 February 1919. His rival Erhard Auer was also wounded in an attack. Other acts of violence were the killings of both Major Paul Ritter von Jahreiß and the conservative MP Heinrich Osel. In this political turmoil, Berlin sent in the military – called the "White Guards of Capitalism" by the communists. On 3 April 1919, Hitler was elected as the liaison of his military battalion and again on 15 April. During this time he urged his unit to stay out of the fighting and not join either side. The Bavarian Soviet Republic was officially crushed on 6 May 1919, when Lt. General Burghard von Oven and his military forces declared the city secure. In the aftermath of arrests and executions, Hitler denounced a fellow liaison, Georg Dufter, as a Soviet "radical rabble-rouser." Other testimony he gave to the military board of inquiry allowed them to root out other members of the military that "had been infected with revolutionary fervor." For his anti-communist views he was allowed to avoid discharge when his unit was disbanded in May 1919.

Army intelligence agent 
In June 1919 he was moved to the demobilization office of the 2nd Infantry Regiment. Around this time the German military command released an edict that the army's main priority was to "carry out, in conjunction with the police, stricter surveillance of the population ... so that the ignition of any new unrest can be discovered and extinguished." In May 1919 Karl Mayr became commander of the 6th Battalion of the guards regiment in Munich and from 30 May as head of the "Education and Propaganda Department" (Dept Ib/P) of the Bavarian Reichswehr, Headquarters 4. In this capacity as head of the intelligence department, Mayr recruited Hitler as an undercover agent in early June 1919. Under Captain Mayr, "national thinking" courses were arranged at the Reichswehrlager Lechfeld near Augsburg, with Hitler attending from 10–19 July. During this time Hitler impressed Mayr. He assigned Hitler to an anti-bolshevik "educational commando" as 1 of 26 instructors in the summer of 1919.
 
As an appointed Verbindungsmann (intelligence agent) of an Aufklärungskommando (reconnaissance commando) of the Reichswehr, Hitler's job was to influence other soldiers and to infiltrate the German Workers' Party (DAP). While monitoring the activities of the DAP, Hitler became attracted to the founder Anton Drexler's antisemitic, nationalist, anti-capitalist, and anti-Marxist ideas. Impressed with Hitler's oratory skills, Drexler invited him to join the DAP, which Hitler did on 12 September 1919.

Henry Tandey incident 
Although disputed, Hitler and decorated British soldier Henry Tandey allegedly encountered each other at the French village of Marcoing. The story is set on 28 September 1918, while Tandey was serving with the 5th Duke of Wellington's Regiment, and relates that a weary German soldier wandered into Tandey's line of fire. The enemy soldier was wounded and did not even attempt to raise his own rifle. Tandey chose not to shoot. The German soldier saw him lower his rifle and nodded his thanks before wandering off. That soldier is purported to have been Adolf Hitler. The author David Johnson, who wrote a book on Henry Tandey, believes this story was an urban legend.

Hitler apparently saw a newspaper report about Tandey being awarded the Victoria Cross (in October 1918, whilst serving with the 5th Battalion Duke of Wellington's (West Riding) Regiment), recognized him, and clipped the article.

In 1937, Hitler was made aware of a particular Fortunino Matania painting by Dr Otto Schwend, a member of his staff. Schwend had been a medical officer during the First Battle of Ypres in 1914. He had been sent a copy of the painting by a Lieutenant Colonel Earle in 1936. Earle had been treated by Schwend in a medical post at the Menin Crossroads and they remained in touch after the war.

The painting was commissioned by the Green Howards Regiment from the Italian artist in 1923, showing a soldier purported to be Tandey carrying a wounded man at the Kruiseke Crossroads in 1914, northwest of Menin. The painting was made from a sketch, provided to Matania, by the regiment, based on an actual event at that crossroads. A building shown behind Tandey in the painting belonged to the Van Den Broucke family, who were presented with a copy of the painting by the Green Howards Regiment.

Schwend obtained a large photo of the painting. Captain Weidemann, Hitler's adjutant, wrote the following response:

Apparently Hitler identified the soldier carrying the wounded man as Tandey from the photo of him in the newspaper clipping he had obtained in 1918.

In 1938, when Neville Chamberlain visited Hitler at his alpine retreat, the Berghof, for the discussions that led to the Munich Agreement, he noticed the painting and asked about it. Hitler replied: That man came so near to killing me that I thought I should never see Germany again; Providence saved me from such devilishly accurate fire as those English boys were aiming at us.

According to the story, Hitler asked Chamberlain to convey his best wishes and gratitude to Tandey. Chamberlain promised to phone Tandey in person on his return, which apparently he did. The Cadbury Research Centre, which holds copies of Chamberlain's papers and diaries, has no references relating to Tandey from the records of the 1938 meeting. The story further states that the phone was answered by a nine-year-old child called William Whateley. William was related to Tandey's wife Edith. However, Tandey at that time lived at 22 Cope Street, Coventry, and worked for the Triumph Motor Company. According to the company records, they only had three phone lines, none of which was at Tandey's address. British Telecommunications archive records also have no telephones registered to that address in 1938.

Historical research throws serious doubts on whether the incident actually ever occurred. Hitler took his second leave from military service on 10 September 1918 for 18 days. This means that he was in Germany on the presumed date of the alleged event.

In 1918 Hitler did however fight opposite Anthony Eden, a future British prime minister, as they both found out when they met during the Munich negotiations.

Rearmament

Six days after being sworn in as Chancellor in 1933, Hitler met with the German military leaders, declaring that his first priority was rearmament. The new Defense Minister, General Werner von Blomberg, introduced Nazi principles into the armed forces, emphasizing the concept of Volksgemeinschaft (national community), in which Germans were united in a classless society. "The uniform makes all men equal." Military rank specified a chain of command, not class boundaries. Officers were instructed to mingle with other ranks. Blomberg's decree on the army and National Socialism on 25 May 1934 ordered: "When non-commissioned officers and men take part in any festivity, care must be taken that the officers do not all sit together. I request that this guidance be given the most serious attention." The rapidly expanding armed forces enlisted many new officers and men from the Hitler Youth. The American William L. Shirer reported that all ranks ate the same rations, socialized when off duty, and that officers were concerned with their men's personal problems.

On 1 August 1934, a new law stated that on Hindenburg's death the presidency would be abolished, and its powers merged with those of the Chancellor. From that day onward, Hitler would be known as Führer and Reich Chancellor. As head of state, Hitler became supreme commander of all armed forces. Hindenburg died the following day. (The new office was confirmed by a plebiscite on 19 August 1934.) Blomberg, on his own initiative, introduced the Oath of 2 August 1934: "I swear by God this sacred oath that I will render unconditional obedience to the Führer of the German Reich and people, Adolf Hitler, the commander in chief of the armed forces, and, as a brave soldier, will be prepared at all times to stake my life for this oath." (In 1939, God was removed from the oath.) The Reichswehr was reorganized as the Wehrmacht on 21 May 1935, bringing the army, navy and air force under unified command.

Hitler guided the steps of their rearmament, thanks to his retentive memory and interest in technical questions. General Alfred Jodl wrote that Hitler's "astounding technical and tactical vision led him also to become the creator of modern weaponry for the army". He hammered home arguments by reciting long passages from Frederick the Great and other military thinkers. "Although the generals might at times refer to Hitler as a 'facile amateur', he was so far as an understanding of military history and weapons technology went, better educated and equipped than most of them." On 4 February 1938, after Blomberg's disgrace and retirement, Hitler announced in a decree: "From henceforth I exercise personally the immediate command over the whole armed forces." He abolished the War Ministry and took Blomberg's other title, Commander-in-Chief, for himself. By that year's end, the army had more than 1 million men and 25,000 officers.

World War II

In his speech of 1 September 1939 at Kroll Opera House following the invasion of Poland, Hitler declared: "From now on I am just the first soldier of the German Reich.  I have once more put on the coat that was most sacred and dear to me. I will not take it off again until victory is secured, or I will not survive the outcome."
From then on, he began wearing a grey military jacket with a swastika eagle sewn on the upper left sleeve. Throughout the war, the only military decorations Hitler displayed were his Wound Badge and Iron Cross from World War I and the Nazi Golden Party Badge. Hitler's position in World War II was essentially supreme commander of the German Armed Forces (Oberbefehlshaber der Deutschen Wehrmacht).

After ordering the preparations for the attack on Poland, he scrutinised all the staff prepared for the first three days of operations down to the regimental level. He rewrote the plans for the capture of a crucial bridge, making them much bolder. His status with the military escalated when they seized Norway and conquered Western Europe, with the major thrust coming through the Ardennes, which he had implemented despite the misgivings of many professional advisers.

By 1938, Hitler had started becoming obsessed with his life mission and became convinced of his own infallibility. He stopped listening to counter-opinions and became overconfident in his own political moves and military expertise following the early victories. Hitler deepened his involvement in the war effort by appointing himself commander-in-chief of the German Army (Heer) in December 1941; thus taking a direct operational posting usually held by a full German general. From this point forward he personally directed the war against the Soviet Union, while his military commanders facing the Western Allies retained a degree of autonomy. Hitler's leadership became increasingly disconnected from reality as the war turned against Germany, with the military's defensive strategies often hindered by his slow decision making and frequent directives to hold untenable positions. Nevertheless, he continued to believe that only his leadership could deliver victory. In the final months of the war Hitler refused to consider peace negotiations, regarding the destruction of Germany as preferable to surrender. The military did not challenge Hitler's dominance of the war effort, and senior officers generally supported and enacted his decisions. By 22 April 1945, when he finally acknowledged that the war was lost, Hitler told Generals Wilhelm Keitel and Jodl that he had no further orders to give.

Awards and decorations
Decorations from World War I
Iron Cross, Second Class – 2 December 1914
Bavarian Cross of Military Merit, Third Class with Swords– 17 September 1917
Regimental Diploma (Regiment "List") – 5 May 1918
Wound Badge in Black – 18 May 1918
Iron Cross, First Class – 4 August 1918
Bavarian Medal of Military Service, Third Class – 25 August 1918
Cross of Honor with Swords – 13 July 1934 (retroactively awarded to all war veterans)

After the end of the war, the only decorations Hitler regularly wore were the Wound Badge and First Class Iron Cross. Of the Nazi Party badges, the Golden Party Badge number '1' was the only one he wore on a regular basis.

References
Informational notes

Citations

Bibliography

 
 
 
 
 
 
 
 
 
 
 
 
 
 
 
 
 
 
 
 
 
 
 
 
 
 
 

Hitler